F.C. Roei Heshbon Tel Aviv (Moadon Sport Roei Heshbon Tel Aviv, lit. Certified Public Accountants Tel Aviv Sport Club or in short , Mem Samekh Roah Tel Aviv, lit. F.C. C.P.A. Tel Aviv) is an Israeli football club based in Tel Aviv. They play their home matches at Kiryat Shalom Ground, located at Maccabi Tel Aviv's training center in Kiryat Shalom neighborhood.

The club is currently in Liga Bet South A division.

Background
The club was founded in 2009 by a group of Certified Public Accountants, aiming to combine between Sports and Academy. Approximately 80 percents of the club players are academics, mostly CPAs. Most of the club players have already played for other football clubs, particularly at the lower levels of Israeli football league system.

The club has cooperation with the youth section of Maccabi Tel Aviv. Roei Heshbon players are passing academic tutoring for Maccabi Tel Aviv youth players, and prepare them for the matriculation exams. In return, Roei Heshbon are given the opportunity to train and host home matches at Maccabi Tel Aviv's training center in Kiryat Shalom.

History
The club started at Liga Gimel Tel Aviv division in the 2009–10 season. After five seasons playing at the bottom tier, the club won the Tel Aviv division in the 2013–14 season, after a close battle with A.S. Holon, and was promoted for the first time in its history to Liga Bet, the fourth tier of Israeli football.

The club finished its first season in Liga Bet at the ninth place of South A division.

Honours
Liga Gimel Tel Aviv:
2013–14

External links
Moadon Sport Roah Tel Aviv Israel Football Association

References
CPAs at day, Footballers at evening The Israel Football Association 

Association football clubs established in 2009
Roei Heshbon Tel Aviv
Football clubs in Tel Aviv
2009 establishments in Israel